Emma of Lesum or Emma of Stiepel (also known as Hemma and Imma) (c. 975-980 – 3 December 1038) was a countess popularly venerated as a saint for her good works; she is also the first female inhabitant of Bremen to be known by name.

See also
List of Catholic saints
Saint Emma of Lesum, patron saint archive

Notes

Sources
Schwarzwälder, Herbert, 2003: Das Große Bremen-Lexikon. Edition Temmen.

External links
 
 
  Heiligenlexikon
  Kirchensite.de
  Bremen Town Park

10th-century births
1038 deaths
Year of birth uncertain
German countesses
German Roman Catholic saints
History of Bremen (city)
People from Bremen
11th-century German women
Christian female saints of the Middle Ages
11th-century Christian saints
House of Immedinger